Karate competitions at the 2021 Junior Pan American Games in Cali, Colombia were held from 3 to 5 December 2021.

Medal summary

Medal table

Medalists

Men's

Women's

References

External links
Karate at the 2021 Junior Pan American Games

Karate
Junior Pan American Games